Aliceia is a genus of sea snails, marine gastropod mollusks in the family Raphitomidae.

The taxonomic position of Aliceia is rather uncertain. It may as well belong to the family Turridae (resembling genus Lucerapex) or to the family Clathurellidae (resembling Pleurotomoides or Famelica). The species Thatcheriasyrinx sp. Kay, 1979 may also belong to Aliceia.

Species
Species within the genus Aliceia include:
 Aliceia aenigmatica Dautzenberg & Fischer H., 1897
 Aliceia okutanii Sasaki & Warén, 2007
 Aliceia simplicissima (Thiele, 1925)

References

External links
 Dautzenberg P. & Fischer H. (1897). Dragages effectués par l'Hirondelle et par la Princesse Alice 1888-1896. Mémoires de la Société Zoologique de France. 139-234; pl. 3-7
 
  Bouchet, P.; Kantor, Y. I.; Sysoev, A.; Puillandre, N. (2011). A new operational classification of the Conoidea (Gastropoda). Journal of Molluscan Studies. 77(3): 273-308
 Worldwide Mollusc Species Data Base: Raphitomidae

 
Raphitomidae
Gastropod genera